The 2007–08 FA Cup (known as The FA Cup sponsored by E.ON for sponsorship reasons) was the 127th season of the world's oldest football knockout competition, the FA Cup. A record 731 clubs' entries were accepted for the competition.

The competition culminated with the final held at Wembley Stadium, London on 17 May 2008. The match was contested by Portsmouth and Cardiff City; Nwankwo Kanu scored the only goal of the game to give Portsmouth the title.

The appearance in the Cup Final by Cardiff City, a Level 2 team, marked the second time in 5 years that a team outside Level 1 of the English football pyramid appeared in the final game.

This was the last FA Cup to be broadcast by the BBC and Sky Sports in the United Kingdom, before coverage was handed over to ITV and Setanta starting in August 2008.

Calendar

First round proper

This round is the first in which Football League teams from League One and League Two compete with non-league teams.
Ties were played over the weekend of 10 November and 11 November 2007.
Leeds United, now a third-tier side, made their earliest ever entry to the FA Cup and suffered a surprise 1–0 home defeat to Hereford United in the replay that followed a goalless draw.

Second round proper
The draw was made on 11 November 2007.
Ties were played over the weekend of 1 December 2007.

Third round proper
This round marks the first time Championship and Premier League (top-flight) teams play. Matches were played on the weekend of Saturday, 5 January 2008. The draw was made on 2 December 2007 at 15:15 GMT by Kevin Beattie and Sammy Nelson, adjudicated by Sir Trevor Brooking.

Involved in the Third Round draw for the first time ever were Havant & Waterlooville and Chasetown. Chasetown are the lowest-ranked team ever to have reached this stage of the FA Cup. The draw itself produced few major ties, with the exception of Chelsea drawing their West London rivals, Queens Park Rangers, and Aston Villa drawing Manchester United as their Third Round opponents for the fourth time in seven seasons, and the second time in successive years.

Fourth round proper
The draw was held at 13:30 GMT on Monday, 7 January 2008. The event was hosted by Sir Trevor Brooking, with Alan Cork and John Aldridge making the draw. Fourth Round matches were played on the weekend of 26 January 2008. For the first time since 1957, there were no replays for the Fourth Round as all ties were settled at the first game.

This was Havant & Waterlooville's first fourth round appearance. They lost 5–2 to Liverpool at Anfield. After Havant's elimination, Bristol Rovers became the lowest ranked team left in the Cup. They play in League One with fellow Fifth Round qualifiers Huddersfield Town.

The BBC's Match of the Day broadcast live matches from two stadia that it had never broadcast live matches before; from Field Mill, Mansfield for Mansfield Town's match with Middlesbrough and from the JJB Stadium, Wigan for Wigan's match with defending champions Chelsea.

Fifth round proper
The draw was held at 13:25 GMT on Monday, 28 January 2008. Sir Trevor Brooking hosted the event held at FA premises at Soho Square, where he was joined by Jimmy Case and Ray Wilkins, who conducted the draw. The matches were held over the weekend of 16 February 2008.

| width="67%" align="left" valign="top" |

Sixth round proper
The draw was held on 18 February 2008 at 13:25 GMT at Soho Square. The draw was conducted by Geoff Thomas and Mark Bright, overseen by Sir Trevor Brooking.

For the second round in a row, the only all-Premier League tie of the round involved Manchester United, who were defeated at home by Portsmouth. Barnsley, who had already knocked out Liverpool in the previous round, produced a similar result in the Sixth Round, beating Chelsea 1–0 at Oakwell. West Bromwich Albion defeated Bristol Rovers away at the Memorial Stadium, whilst Cardiff City caused a third shock of the weekend by beating Premier League team Middlesbrough. There were no replays. The Sixth Round matches were played on the weekend of 8 March 2008.

Semi-finals
The draw was held on 10 March 2008 at 13:25 GMT at Soho Square with Bryan Robson making the draw. Both semi-finals were played at Wembley Stadium and held on 5 April and 6 April 2008. There was only one club from the top flight (Portsmouth) in the draw for the first time since 1908.

Final

The final was held at Wembley Stadium on 17 May 2008, and Portsmouth's 1–0 victory gave them their first major trophy for 58 years and their first FA Cup for 69 years. It was also the first time that the winning team's manager (Harry Redknapp) was an Englishman since Joe Royle guided Everton to FA Cup glory 13 years earlier as well as being the first time a club from outside the Big Four of English football won the Cup since the aforementioned Everton side in 1995.

References

External links

The FA Cup at TheFA.com
FA Cup at BBC.co.uk
FA Cup news at Reuters.co.uk

 
FA Cup seasons
FA Cup
FA Cup